Garfield 'Gary' McCline Armstrong (born 17 April 1965) is a former Bahamian cricketer. Armstrong is a right-handed batsman who bowled right-arm medium pace. Armstrong had represented the Bahamas national cricket team in 27 matches.

Armstrong made his debut for the Bahamas in the 2002 ICC Americas Championship against the United States.

Armstrong made his only Twenty20 appearance for the Bahamas against the Cayman Islands in the 1st round of the 2006 Stanford 20/20.  Armstrong  scored 1 run and took 2/22 with the ball, as the Bahamas lost by 57 runs.

Armstrong also represented the Bahamas in the 2008 ICC World Cricket League Division Five the 2010 ICC Americas Championship Division 2, where his final appearance for the Bahamas came against Suriname.

Family
Armstrong's brother, Llewellyn Armstrong has also played for and captained the Bahamas.

References

External links
Gary Armstrong at Cricinfo
Gary Armstrong at CricketArchive

1965 births
Living people
Bahamian cricketers
Place of birth missing (living people)